The Ligas Departamentales are one of two leagues that form part of the Departamental Stage in the Copa Perú of the Peruvian Football Federation (FPF) football league system. The other league at level are the Ligas Superiores.

Liga Departamental de Amazonas

Liga Departamental de Ancash

Liga Departamental de Apurímac

Liga Departamental de Arequipa

Liga Departamental de Ayacucho

Liga Departamental de Cajamarca

Liga Departamental del Callao

Liga Departamental de Cusco

Liga Departamental de Huancavelica

Liga Departamental de Huánuco

Liga Departamental de Ica

Liga Departamental de Junín

Liga Departamental de La Libertad

Liga Departamental de Lambayeque

Liga Departamental de Lima

Footnotes

A. In 1988, the final between Atlético Soledad (Paramonga) and Asociación Empleados (Mala) was not played.
B. In 1990, the final between Alfonso Ugarte (Huaura) and Juan Bazalar Lamas (Huacho) was not played.
C. In 1991, the final between Unión Supe and Atlético Real Mala was not played.

Liga Departamental de Loreto

Liga Departamental de Madre de Dios

Liga Departamental de Moquegua

Liga Departamental de Pasco

Liga Departamental de Piura

Liga Departamental de Puno

Liga Departamental de San Martín

Liga Departamental de Tacna

Liga Departamental de Tumbes

Liga Departamental de Ucayali

See also
List of football clubs in Peru
Peruvian football league system

External links
List of Departamental Champions 

 

   
5